Harrison is the name of some places in the U.S. state of Wisconsin:
Harrison (village), Wisconsin, a village in Calumet and Outagamie counties
Harrison (town), Calumet County, Wisconsin, a town
Harrison (ghost town), Calumet County, Wisconsin, a ghost town
Harrison, Grant County, Wisconsin, a town
Harrison, Lincoln County, Wisconsin, a town
Harrison (community), Lincoln County, Wisconsin, an unincorporated community
Harrison, Marathon County, Wisconsin, a town
Harrison, Waupaca County, Wisconsin, a town